Quarantine 2: Terminal is a 2011 American horror film and a sequel to the 2008 film, Quarantine. It was written and directed by John Pogue and produced by Marc Brienstock. The film stars Mercedes Mason, Josh Cooke and Mattie Liptak as passengers on an airplane where the mutant rabies virus from the previous film is now spreading, forcing the plane to make an emergency landing at a terminal that is promptly surrounded by the government, trapping the passengers and crew as they search for answers and a means of escape.

Although the first film was a remake of the Spanish film REC, Quarantine 2 has no relation to any of the REC films and has an entirely different plot and setting.

Plot
On a flight from Los Angeles to Kansas City, passenger Ralph Bundt becomes violent and attempts to enter the cockpit. Ralph had been bitten by a lab rat, brought onto the plane by Henry, who claimed they were his classroom's pet hamsters. Ralph bites flight attendant Paula on the face, to the horror of her colleague Jenny. Captain Forrest and First Officer Willsy land the plane at the nearest city. Disobeying orders, they pull up to a jetway operated by baggage handler Ed Ramirez. Everyone flees the plane, except for elderly couple Bev and Doc Stevens and the pilots, who try to contain Ralph in a bathroom. The passengers find that they have been locked out of the terminal, which is quickly surrounded by armed soldiers and CDC scientists.

Passenger Shilah Washington reveals she has a medical kit in her bag in the cargo hold. Jenny, Henry, Ed, and fellow passengers Niall and Preston go to retrieve it. There they find the bathroom empty and covered in blood. Preston gets Doc off the plane, while the others retrieve Shilah's kit and Niall's handgun. Jenny is attacked by an infected Captain Forrest and Niall shoots and kills him, but is splattered by the captain's blood. Leaving the plane, they find Preston's body, and avoid an infected Bev.

Rejoining the others, the group deduces that the infection is probably a form of rabies spread through bites. When Doc is bitten by an infected rat, they lock him and Paula away. George, an unaccompanied minor, tells the others that Henry brought the rats onto the plane. As Henry tells Jenny that George is just confused, they are attacked by the escaped Ralph, but kill him with the help of Ed and Shilah.

Four heavily armed officers arrive to administer drugs to the group, but also release the infected passengers from their confinement. Passenger Louise Treadwell is bitten by her infected cat, while the infected Doc bites one of the officers. After shooting Doc, the officers and a passenger named Hvorst attempt to evacuate but are shot and killed by personnel outside the doors, leaving Hvorst's girlfriend, Nicca, distraught. Ed drags one surviving officer back inside. The survivors hear the screams of the infected (at this point they are Willsy, Louise, Preston, and Paula). Ed points out an airport catering truck the survivors can hide in. As the others clamber inside the truck, Niall and Susan share a loving embrace, until Niall begins to drool and turns. Henry and the others grab Susan and begin pulling her into the truck. Niall, fully turned, grabs her from the back and pulls her off the truck floor. The group in the truck question the wounded officer, who reveals that he does not represent the CDC but rather CBDT, meaning Chemical Biological Domestic Terrorism, a division of the Department of Homeland Security that specializes in countering chemical and biological terrorism. He tells them about a quarantined building in Los Angeles that housed a lab for a group of bioterrorists and confirms that the drugs are only experimental antidotes. The wounded officer then shoots himself. Just as Ed suggests escaping through an old drainage tunnel beneath the terminal, Willsy appears on the roof of the truck; George then raises the truck and crushes Willsy.

The survivors access the tunnel, though Nicca is attacked and dragged away. Jenny kills an attacking Paula. While searching for directions to the tunnel, the group is attacked by Niall and Susan. Henry kills them, but he is bitten. George confronts him with suspicious evidence concerning viruses that he found in Henry's briefcase, to which Henry admits being part of the terrorist cell at the apartment building, who have planned a worldwide plague to cull the human population. After a struggle, Henry shoots and kills Ed, administers his trial antidote to himself and then kidnaps George to use him as a human shield. Shilah and Jenny separate to find George and Henry.

While searching for George and Henry, Jenny is chased and attacked by an infected Preston. Running along the baggage conveyor belts Jenny eventually taunts him into crawling into part of the conveyor belts machinery and kills him. 
Continuing to look, Jenny quietly sneaks past an infected Nicca. Shilah finds Jenny and gives her thermal goggles. She then reveals to Jenny that she has been bitten, and sacrifices herself to the infected so Jenny can escape. While escaping into the wall, Jenny is attacked by an infected Louise but she knocks her unconscious with the wrench. Jenny uses the goggles and finds George near the tunnel, where he tells her the antidote has failed and that Henry is mutating into a rat-like infected, who appears and attacks her. After a struggle with Jenny, George shoots him and Jenny bashes in his skull.

As Jenny and George crawl through the dark drainage tunnel, George sees through the thermal goggles that she has been bitten. George escapes through the grate at the end of the drainage tunnel but Jenny cannot fit through the bars, and he reluctantly leaves her behind as she succumbs to the infection. George discards the thermal vision goggles, through which Louise's infected cat is seen walking towards the Luxor Las Vegas hotel, implying that the plane landed at McCarran International Airport and that all efforts to contain the virus have failed.

Cast 
 Mercedes Masöhn as Jenny
 Mattie Liptak as George
 Josh Cooke as Henry
 Noree Victoria as Shilah Washington
 Ignacio Serricchio as Ed Ramirez 
 Phillip Devona as Niall Britz
 Julie Gribble as Susan Britz
 Tyler Kunkle as Hvorst
 Erin Aine Smith as Nicca
 Sandra Lafferty as Louise Tredwell
 Lamar Stewart as Preston
 Tom Thon as Doc Stevens
 Lynn Cole as Bev Stevens
 Bre Blair as Paula
 George Back as Ralph Bundt
 John Curran as Captain Forrest
 Andrew Benator as Willsy
 Jason Benjamin as CDC #1
 Beau Turpin as CDC #2
 Neko Parham as CDC #3
 Judd Lormand as Sylvester
 Blake Mason as Lee Blake

Production
In May 2010, a sequel to Quarantine began moving forward at Screen Gems with John Pogue writing and directing and Robert Green Hall returning as the film's makeup designer. The following month, Bloody Disgusting reported the film was scheduled to begin filming in Los Angeles, California with Mercedes Masohn and Josh Cooke cast as in the lead roles. Filming was moved to Atlanta and Griffin, Georgia, with a majority of the film being shot in an abandoned distribution facility. Production ended in July 2010. Unlike its predecessor, the film is not presented in the found footage format. Instead Pogue opted to shoot the film handheld, in vein of filmmakers such as Rodrigo Prieto and Paul Greengrass.

Release
On January 27, 2011, Quarantine 2: Terminal debuted at the Gérardmer Film Festival in France. The film was given a limited release in theaters on June 17, 2011. The DVD was released on August 2, 2011 in the United States.

Critical reception
Quarantine 2: Terminal received an approval of 75% on Rotten Tomatoes with an average rating of 5.42/10, based on 8 reviews.

Some critics have positively received the film's use of special effects and the scares, but have criticized the lack of character development and originality.

See also
 Flight of the Living Dead: Outbreak on a Plane
 Snakes on a Plane

References

External links
 

2011 films
2011 horror films
2010s science fiction horror films
American science fiction horror films
American sequel films
American aviation films
American zombie films
Bioterrorism in fiction
Films about viral outbreaks
Films directed by John Pogue
Films produced by Roy Lee
Films set in 2008
Films set in Los Angeles
Films set in Nevada
Films set in airports
Films set on airplanes
2011 directorial debut films
Vertigo Entertainment films
2010s English-language films
2010s American films
Sony Pictures direct-to-video films